Bob Ryder (October 22, 1956 – November 24, 2020) was an American professional wrestling journalist and one of the founders of Impact Wrestling (then Total Nonstop Action).

Ryder had been an innovator in the online wrestling community as he was the head of Prodigy's professional wrestling area. During this time, he became the first person to conduct an online interview for the World Wrestling Federation (WWF, now WWE), when he interviewed Kevin Nash and Shawn Michaels during WrestleMania XI in 1995. He was also the founder of 1Wrestling.com and the webmaster for Extreme Championship Wrestling's (ECW) website. During the Monday Night Wars, Ryder worked for World Championship Wrestling (WCW), where he co-hosted WCW Live with Jeremy Borash. He was close friends with WCW President Eric Bischoff. Along with Borash, their voices were the last to ever be heard on a WCW broadcast after it was bought by WWF in 2001.

Concerned about a WWF monopoly in the professional wrestling industry after the fall of WCW and ECW, Ryder convinced Jeff and Jerry Jarrett to start a pay-per-view exclusive promotion in what would become NWA:Total Nonstop Action and is now known as Impact Wrestling. Ryder was the first and longest tenured employee in the company's history, being employed from its launch in 2002 until his death in 2020. He held multiple positions in the company, including working as their Director of Travel Operations.

During the last few years of his life, Ryder battled multiple myeloma. He was initially given three to six months to live but eventually saw his cancer go into remission. However, his cancer returned and he was found dead in his Nashville home on November 25, 2020, at the age of 64. He had maintained his position in Impact and worked from home while undergoing chemotherapy. In a statement released after his death, Impact referred to him as the "heart and soul of the promotion." Bill Apter closed 1Wrestling.com after his death.

Works

References

1956 births
2020 deaths
American Internet company founders
American male journalists
Deaths from cancer in Tennessee
Deaths from multiple myeloma
Impact Wrestling executives
Journalists from Tennessee
Professional wrestling announcers
Professional wrestling journalists and columnists
Writers from Nashville, Tennessee